Wang Lezheng is a Paralympian athlete from China competing mainly in category F42 throwing events.

Wang competed in the 2008 Summer Paralympics in his home country of China, competing in the F42 shot put and F42 discus where he won the bronze medal.

References

Paralympic athletes of China
Athletes (track and field) at the 2008 Summer Paralympics
Athletes (track and field) at the 2012 Summer Paralympics
Paralympic bronze medalists for China
Living people
Chinese male shot putters
Chinese male discus throwers
Medalists at the 2008 Summer Paralympics
Medalists at the 2012 Summer Paralympics
Year of birth missing (living people)
Paralympic medalists in athletics (track and field)
21st-century Chinese people
Medalists at the 2010 Asian Para Games
Medalists at the World Para Athletics Championships